Vera Berdich (1915 – October 12, 2003) was an American printmaker.

Life
Berdich worked for the Works Progress Administration at Hull House. She graduated from the School of the Art Institute of Chicago with a B.A. in 1946 and taught etching there from 1947 to 1979.
She was an influence on the Chicago Imagists group.

Berdich's papers are held at the Archives of American Art. She was also known under the names Veronica Berdich, Veronika Berdich and Veronica Berdick.

Collections
Berdich's works are held in the collections of the Victoria and Albert Museum, the Seattle Art Museum, the Library of Congress, Smithsonian Institution, Museum of Modern Art, and the Art Institute of Chicago.

Exhibitions
1995 "The Unquiet Eye: Vera Berdich, A Retrospective." Chicago Cultural Center
2008  "Twilight Shadows", Printworks Gallery
2010  "Chicago Stories: Prints and H. C. Westermann—See America First", Art Institute of Chicago
2010  "On & Of Paper: Selections from the Illinois State Museum Collection", Illinois State Museum Chicago Gallery

References

External links
http://www.artic.edu/aic/collections/artwork/artist/2554
http://www.printworkschicago.com/artists/berdich/berdich.htm
http://www.askart.com/askart/b/vera_berdich/vera_berdich.aspx

1915 births
American printmakers
2003 deaths
American women printmakers
20th-century American women artists
21st-century American women